Joseph Wooten (born December 15, 1961) is an American keyboardist, singer, songwriter, author and philanthropist. Since 1993 he has been a member of the Steve Miller Band.

Early life 
Joseph was the fourth of five children born to Dorothy and Elijah Wooten. His brothers: Victor Wooten, Roy "Futureman" Wooten, Regi Wooten and Rudy Wooten (deceased) all are musicians. By the age of 11, Joseph was performing with his brothers in their family band, The Wooten Brothers. As a United States Air Force family, they moved around often, finally settling in the Warwick Lawns neighborhood of Newport News, Virginia in 1972. Joseph graduated from Denbigh High School in 1979. While in high school, Joseph and his brothers played in the country music venue at Busch Gardens theme park in Williamsburg, Virginia.

Career 
Joseph has been keyboard player and background vocalist since 1993 for the Steve Miller Band. Wooten also has two solo albums, Soul of Freedom (2013) and Hands of Soul (2003), as well as production credits on over 35 albums.

Wooten is a frequent speaker at schools across the country. In February 2018, he spoke at the Harmony School of Innovation in Fort Worth, Texas. Wooten gave a TEDx talk entitled "Nothing is Everything It All Matters" to a sold-out auditorium at the Halloran Centre in Downtown Memphis on January 6, 2018. Wooten performed his song "Unity" live on the Today in Nashville show in February 2018. Wooten performed "We Are American" with his band The Hands of Soul on the Today in Nashville show in November 2018.

Discography

Publications 
Wooten has also written a book titled: It All Matters: What I Believe, Words I Live By.

Charitable work 
In September 2015 collaborated with You are Never Alone Foundation (YANAF) to perform for students at Mount Anthony Union High School as part of a 'You are Never Alone Foundation Presentation' to raise awareness about homelessness.

References

External links 

1961 births
Living people
African-American rock musicians
Steve Miller Band members
21st-century African-American people
20th-century African-American people